The Tied Up Balloon is a Bulgarian satirical comedy-drama film released in 1967, directed by Binka Zhelyazkova, starring Georgi Partsalev, Grigor Vachkov, Georgi Kaloyanchev, Konstantin Kotsev and Georgi Georgiev-Getz. The screenplay, written by Yordan Radichkov is based on his play Bustle.

During the second world war, a barrage balloon appears out of nowhere in the sky above a Bulgarian village. This shakes the imagination of the peasants and causes endless speculations, assumptions and contentions.

Almost immediately after the premiere, the film was stopped by the communist authority because of the direct display of the actual reality in the Bulgarian villages as well as for the hints about the origin of many of the communist leaders. After the restoration of the democracy in 1990, the movie came into a broad view and was recognized as one of the masterpieces of the Bulgarian cinematography from that time.

Cast
Grigor Vachkov as the man with the pistol
Georgi Kaloyanchev as a peasant 
Georgi Partsalev as a peasant
Konstantin Kotsev as a peasant 
Georgi Georgiev-Getz as a peasant
Ivan Bratanov as a peasant
Konstantin Kisimov as the blind man
Lyubomir Dimitrov as a peasant
Tsvyatko Nikolov as a peasant
Petar Slabakov
Vasil Popiliev
Janet Miteva as the girl in white
Stoyan Gadev
Dosyo Dosev
Ivan Obretenov
Nikola Dadov
Neycho Popov
Stoyanka Mutafova
Domna Ganeva

References

Sources

External links
 
 The Tied Up Balloon at the Bulgarian National Film Archive 
 The Tied Up Balloon at the Bulgarian National Television 
 The Tied Up Balloon at Kultura newspaper. 

1960s Bulgarian-language films
1967 films
Bulgarian World War II films
Bulgarian satirical films
Bulgarian comedy-drama films
Films set in Bulgaria
Films shot in Bulgaria
Films directed by Binka Zhelyazkova
1967 comedy-drama films